The following is a list of players who have kicked the most goals for the West Coast Eagles in each season of the Australian Football League (AFL), formerly known as the Victorian Football League (VFL).

Peter Sumich holds the record for the most goals kicked in a season by an Eagles player, having kicked 111 goals in 1991. Sumich also holds the record for the most times as leading goalkicker (seven) and most consecutive times as leading goalkicker (six, between 1989 and 1994). Scott Cummings became the first Eagles player to win the Coleman Medal for the most goals kicked in the AFL in one season in 1999. Josh Kennedy joined Cummings in 2015, winning West Coast's second ever Coleman medal with 75 goals in the 2015 home and away season. Josh Kennedy also has the most goals overall for West Coast (584, as of round 18 2019).

Leading goalkickers by year

AFL Women's

References

West Coast Goalkicking Records

Goalk
Australian rules football-related lists